A Parade of Animals, or Parade of Animals, is an outdoor bronze sculpture series by Peter Helzer, installed in Willson Park, on the Oregon State Capitol grounds, in Salem, Oregon, United States.

Description

The installation features three groups of animals playing musical instruments. One depicts two stacked frogs; the one on bottom is walking on stilts and the one on top is playing the concertina. Another shows two crocodiles, one of which is playing a drum and horn. The third sculpture depicts three rodents, one of which is carrying a horn.

History
The sculptures were dedicated in 1991 and commemorate the children of Oregon. Their condition were deemed "well maintained" during the Smithsonian Institution's "Save Outdoor Sculpture!" survey in July 1993. Parade of Animals was administered by Oregon's Department of Administrative Services at the time.

See also
 1991 in art
 Statue of Rosa Parks (Eugene, Oregon)
 The Storyteller (sculpture), Eugene

References

1991 establishments in Oregon
1991 sculptures
Animal sculptures in Oregon
Frogs in art
Mammals in art
Monuments and memorials in Salem, Oregon
Musical instruments in art
Outdoor sculptures in Salem, Oregon
Reptiles in art